Prunus trichantha, ( "hairy petal Tibetan cherry"), is a species of Prunus native to the Himalayas (Tibet, Sikkim and Nepal), preferring to grow at 2800–3900m. It is typically a tree 2-10m tall.

References

trichantha
Flora of Tibet
Flora of East Himalaya
Plants described in 1912